Smaragde Mbonyintege (born 2 February 1947) is the Catholic Bishop of Kabgayi, in Rwanda.

Smaragde Mbonyintege was born on 2 February 1947 in Cyeza parish, Kabgayi diocese, in the current Kayumbu Sector in Kamonyi District, Southern Province.
He received his primary and secondary education from church schools.
He studied in the Minor Seminary of St. Paul in Kigali.
He went on to the Saint Charles Borromeo Major Seminary of Nyakibanda, where he studied philosophy (1969-1972) and theology (1972-1975).  
He was ordained in 1975 in the Diocese of Kabgayi. He attended the Pontifical Gregorian University in Rome from 1979 to 1983, earning an MA in Spiritual Theology.

Mbonyintege was a teacher and spiritual director at the Nyakibanda Major Seminary from 1983 to 1996. 
In 1996 he was appointed Rector of the Nyakibanda Major Seminary.
On 22 January 2006 Pope Benedict XVI appointed him Bishop of Kabgayi, Rwanda, effective 26 March 2006.
He was succeeded as rector at the seminary by father Antoine Kambanda.
In 2009 he was elected President of the Episcopal Conference of Rwanda.

References

1947 births
Living people
People from Muhanga District
21st-century Roman Catholic bishops in Rwanda
Rwandan Roman Catholic bishops
Roman Catholic bishops of Kabgayi